I ragazzi del muretto is an Italian television series.

External links
 

Italian television series
1991 Italian television series debuts
1996 Italian television series endings
1990s Italian television series
RAI original programming